This is a list of publications on the occasion of the Boekenweek, an annual event held in the Netherlands dedicated to Dutch literature. The Boekenweekgeschenk is usually a novel or a collection of short stories; the Kinderboekenweekgeschenk is a children's book. For children too young to read, a picture book, the Prentenboek van de Kinderboekenweek, is published.

Boekenweekgeschenk

Kinderboekenweekgeschenk

References

External links 
  List of publications, Collectieve Propaganda van het Nederlandse Boek

Dutch literature
Publications during the Boekenweek